Criminology is a quarterly peer-reviewed academic journal published by Wiley-Blackwell on behalf of the American Society of Criminology. The editor-in-chief is David McDowall (SUNY-Albany). The journal covers research in criminology, penology, and criminal justice.

According to the Journal Citation Reports, the journal has a 2017 impact factor of 3.796.

References

External links

Quarterly journals
Criminology journals
English-language journals
Publications established in 1988
Wiley-Blackwell academic journals